Electoral district IV (Croatian: IV. izborna jedinica) is one of twelve electoral districts of Croatian Parliament.

Boundaries  
Electoral district IV consist of:

 whole Virovitica-Podravina County;
 whole Osijek-Baranja County.

Election

2000 Elections 
 

HSLS - SDP - SBHS
 Vilim Herman
 Antun Vujić
 Željko Malević
 Damir Jurić
 Viktor Brož
 Sanja Kapetanović
 Dragutin Vukušić

HDZ
 Vladimir Šeks
 Branimir Glavaš
 Đuro Dečak
 Berislav Šmit

HSS - LS - HNS
 Zlatko Kramarić
 Željko Pecek

HSP - HKDU
 Anto Đapić

2003 Elections 
 

HDZ
 Vladimir Šeks
 Branimir Glavaš
 Mato Štimac
 Ivica Buconjić
 Vladimir Šišljagić
 Ivan Drmić
 Josip Đakić

SDP - LS - LIBRA
 Željka Antunović
 Zlatko Kramarić
 Vilim Herman

HSP
 Anto Đapić

HSS 
 Željko Pecek

HNS - SBHS
 Antun Kapraljević

HSU
 Dragutin Pukleš

2007 Elections 
 

HDZ
 Vladimir Šeks
 Tomislav Ivić
 Josip Đakić
 Dragan Kovačević
 Miroslav Škoro
 Ivica Buconjić

SDP
 Biljana Borzan
 Zoran Vinković
 Nada Čavlović Smiljanec
 Dragutin Bodakoš
 Vlatko Podnar

HDSSB
 Branimir Glavaš
 Vladimir Šišljagić

HSP
 Anto Đapić

2011 Elections 
 

SDP
 Biljana Borzan
 Nada Čavlović Smiljanec
 Domagoj Hajduković
 Višnja Fortuna
 Damir Tomić
 Tomislav Žagar

HDZ
 Vladimir Šeks
 Tomislav Ivić
 Josip Đakić
 Josip Salapić

HDSSB
 Vladimir Šišljagić
 Krešimir Bubalo
 Dinko Burić
 Ivan Drmić

2015 Elections 
 

HDZ - HSS - HSP AS - BUZ - HSLS - HRAST - HDS - ZDS
 Milijan Brkić
 Tomislav Tolušić
 Ivan Anušić
 Ivan Tepeš
 Josip Đakić
 Ivan Radić

SDP - HNS - HSU - HL SR - A-HSS - ZS
 Ivan Vrdoljak
 Domagoj Hajduković
 Jaroslav Pecnik
 Tomislav Žagar
 Damir Tomić

HDSSB
 Branimir Glavaš
 Vladimir Šišljagić

Most
 Miroslav Šimić

2016 Elections 
 

HDZ
 Tomislav Tolušić
 Miroslav Tuđman
 Ivan Anušić
 Vlatko Kopić
 Josip Đakić
 Irena Petrijevčanin Vuksanović

SDP - HNS - HSS - HSU
 Ivan Vrdoljak
 Domagoj Hajduković
 Ana-Marija Petin
 Tomislav Žagar
 Damir Tomić

HDSSB - HKS
 Branimir Glavaš

Most
 Miroslav Šimić

ŽZ - PH - AM - Abeceda
 Hrvoje Runtić

2020 Elections 
 

HDZ
 Ivan Anušić
 Josip Đakić
 Ivan Radić
 Nataša Tramišak
 Marko Pavić
 Vesna Bedeković
 Josip Škorić
 Hrvoje Šimić

SDP - HNS - HSS - HSU
 Sabina Glasovac
 Domagoj Hajduković
 Romana Nikolić

DP - HS - BLOK - HKS - HRAST - SU - ZL
 Vesna Vučemilović
 Krešimir Bubalo
 Mario Radić

References 

Electoral districts in Croatia